Jub Gowhar or Jubgowhar may refer to:
 Jub Gowhar-e Olya
 Jub Gowhar-e Sofla